The Concepcion–Clark Transmission Line (abbreviated as 8LI1CON-CLK, 8LI2CON-CLK) is a 230,000 volt, double-circuit transmission line in Tarlac and Pampanga, Philippines that connects Concepcion Substation of National Grid Corporation of the Philippines (NGCP) and Clark Substation of Clark Electric Distribution Corporation (CEDC).

History
The Concepcion–Clark Transmission Line went into service on August 24, 2008. It was built to ensure a reliable supply for Texas Instruments in Clark. It is operated and maintained by the privately owned National Grid Corporation of the Philippines (NGCP) since January 15, 2009, and previously by government-owned National Transmission Corporation (TransCo). It is also owned by TransCo since its completion in August 2008. Line 1 was energized at 69kV on July 11, 2008, and line 2 on August 24, 2008, and were later uprated to their current voltage of 230kV on December 9 and November 30, 2009, respectively.

Route description
The Concepcion–Clark Transmission Line passes through the municipalities of Concepcion and Bamban in Tarlac and the city of Mabalacat in Pampanga. It is located within the service area of NGCP's North Luzon Operations and Maintenance (NLOM) District 6 (South Central Plain).

The transmission line starts at Concepcion Substation, parallels with San Manuel–Concepcion–Mexico transmission line, turns right upon entering Subic–Clark–Tarlac Expressway (SCTEx) and run parallel into the said expressway until Clark North Exit. It then intersects with San Manuel–Concepcion–Mexico line before passing through Concepcion Exit. Between Concepcion and New Clark City exits, line 2 of the transmission line passes through Seaoil gas station and CityMall SCTEx while line 1 passes through PTT gas station. Upon approaching New Clark City exit and passing through Sacobia River, the line will utilize the western side of SCTEx. It again utilize both sides of the expressway after passing the said river, continues straightforward, and ends at Clark Substation.

Technical description
The transmission line consists of 185 steel poles which are used from its entry to SCTEx until its approach to New Clark City exit and after Sacobia River to Clark North Exit, 20 lattice towers from Concepcion Substation until its entry to SCTEx, upon passing through New Clark City exit and Sacobia River and at its terminus at Clark Substation, and 2 portal towers at the power line's intersection with San Manuel–Concepcion–Mexico transmission line totaling to 207 transmission structures. Lattice towers have six insulators, with each side carry both circuits, while steel poles separates the transmission line's lines 1 and 2 as the portion of a power line that uses poles utilize both sides of SCTEx and each pole have three insulators. Steel poles can either have a flag (suspension and anchor variants) or triangle tower designs. It is a double-circuit, unbundled power line and originally had a voltage of 69kV before being energized to its current voltage of 230kV.

Gallery

Notes

References

Energy infrastructure completed in 2008
2008 establishments in the Philippines
Transmission lines in the Philippines
Buildings and structures in Tarlac
Buildings and structures in Pampanga